Scirpus sylvaticus, the wood clubrush, is a species of flowering plant in the sedge family.

Scirpus sylvaticus can reach 1 m, and has triangular stems.

S. sylvaticus widespread in Eurasia, is very common in the European part of Russia and in Southern Siberia. It is most often a coastal species, occurring in wet habitat such as marshes in brackish and saltwater, along swamps, along the banks of water bodies, in marshy forests and in wet meadows. It is a perennial herb growing from a rhizome system with associated tubers.

This plant is an important food source for waterfowl. The seeds are food for birds and other animals, such as muskrats.

References

External links
 Verspreiding in Nederland FLORON
 Foto's
 
 
 

sylvaticus
Taxa named by Carl Linnaeus